2021 saw some of the most extreme flooding on record, in large part driven by climate change. The insurance industry analysis group Swiss RE found that 31% of global insurance losses were from flooding, and that nearly a fifth of the economic damage from natural disasters was uninsured.

Significant floods

Australia

China

Europe

India

Uttarakhand

South India

Malaysia

20-21

21-22

North America

Hawaii

Pacific Northwest

See also 

 Weather of 2021
 Tropical cyclones in 2021

Notes

References

 
2020s floods